NYNEX Corporation  was an American telephone company that served five states of New England (Maine, Massachusetts, New Hampshire, Rhode Island and Vermont) as well as most of the state of New York from January 1, 1984 to August 14, 1997.

History
Formed on January 1, 1984 as the result of the breakup of the Bell System, NYNEX was a Regional Bell Operating Company which was made up of former subsidiaries of AT&T, these being New York Telephone and New England Telephone. The name NYNEX was an acronym for New York/New England EXchange.

Bell Atlantic

NYNEX merged with Bell Atlantic on August 14, 1997, in what was at the time the second-largest merger in corporate history in America. Although the surviving company was Bell Atlantic, the merged company moved from the headquarters of Bell Atlantic in Philadelphia to the headquarters of NYNEX in New York City. 

Bell Atlantic acquired GTE on June 30, 2000 to form Verizon Communications, the merger being first announced in April 2000. NYNEX also operated cable television and telephone services in the United Kingdom with offices in Waterlooville (Hampshire), Baguley (Manchester), Shoreham-by-Sea (West Sussex), Leatherhead (Surrey) and Antrim (Northern Ireland).

Virgin Media

In 1996, NYNEX's UK assets were merged with the subsidiary of Cable & Wireless, Mercury Communications, as well as cable operators Vidéotron and Bell Cablemedia, and the new business was subsequently renamed Cable & Wireless Communications.

Cable & Wireless’ cable assets were sold to NTL in July 1999. The acquisition was completed in May 2000. NTL then merged with Telewest in March 2006 to form NTL:Telewest, and was later re branded on February 8, 2007 as Virgin Media.

Criticism
The State of New York impounded $4.1 million of regulated fees collected by NYNEX in August 1996 for failing to meet specific service metrics that had been set by the public utility commission in its order setting service rates. 

In 1995, the state of New York proposed a new turnaround plan intended to help NYNEX improve its customer service. However, there were concerns that it would not work and that the rate reductions proposed by the plan would be too inconsistent.

See also
Western Electric
FairPoint Communications
William C. Ferguson
NYNEX Arena (Manchester, United Kingdom)

References

External links
 www.nynex.com (Archived February 27, 1997)

Telecommunications companies established in 1984 
American companies established in 1984
Defunct companies based in New York (state)
Defunct telecommunications companies of the United States
Bell System
Verizon Communications
Telecommunications companies disestablished in 1997